Khanigaun  is a village development committee in Palpa District in the Lumbini Zone of southern Nepal. At the time of the 1991 Nepal census it had a population of 2221. It is located on the bank of the Kaligandaki river on north. On the north-west side there is Ranimahal known as Taj Mahal of Nepal.

References

Populated places in Palpa District